Bayt al-Ahzan literally means "House of the Sorrows", is a structure which has been destroyed in the Al-Baqi Cemetery in Medinah, the Hejaz. Bayt al-Ahzan is located at the south of ‘Abbas ibn ‘Abd al-Muttalib; and likewise behind the court of four Shia Imams in Baqi', namely: Hasan ibn Ali, Zayn al-Abidin, Muhammad al-Baqir and Ja'far as-Sadiq.

History 
Considering that Fatimah al-Zahra was so sorrowful of her father's passing away and used to cry a lot for him, then her husband Ali built a structure (Bayt al-Ahzan) for her to mourn her father there.

Bayt al-Ahzan is considered to be the third probable place --after Al-Masjid an-Nabawi and al-Baqi' cemetery-- to be the grave place of Fatimah's grave. This building was demolished after the (second) attack of Wahhabists to Hejaz and the occupation of Medina in 1926 (1344 A.H.).

Meaning 
The word bayt in Arabic means "home", and the word "Ahzan" is the plural form of Hozn (sorrow) which means sorrows; and this phrase (Bayt al-Ahzan) altogether means the home of sorrows.

See also 

Bayt al-Mawlid, the house where Muhammad is believed to have been born
Book of Fatimah
Sermon of Fadak given by Fatimah
Muhammad's children

References 

Buildings and structures in Medina
History of Medina
History of Shia Islam